Ernest Edwin Mitchell (16 January 1865 – 10 December 1951) was an Australian composer, conductor, music lecturer and organist. He was born on 16 January 1865, in Port Adelaide, South Australia, when his father, Thomas James Mitchell, was 43 and his mother, Thurza Lucy Cole, was 36. He married Amy Bertha Edmeades on 27 July 1885. He died on 10 December 1951, in Payneham South, South Australia, Australia, at the age of 86, and was buried in Payneham Cemetery, Payneham, South Australia, Australia. They had three children Lillian Bertha Mitchell 1886–1974, Kathleen Lois Mitchell 1895–1972 and Alan Rodney Clemhilt Mitchell 1904–1983.

He was said to be the brother of Nellie Melba although this seems unlikely.

Ernest Mitchell was granted a Bachelor of Music award by Adelaide University. He played Keyboards and organ. He was granted honours in second year  Ernest was a devout member of the uniting church  with passionate feelings about music  particularly the standard of teaching. So keen on quality services, he allowed his musical works to be distributed by newspaper

He acted as secretary of the South Australia music teachers society.

Works

 Eolus
 This Land We Love The Best
 Lovely Voices of the Sky – Christmas Carol
 The Proinces Men
 Two Sacred Songs
 Break Break Break
 Oh Taste and see
 Tomorrow

References

1865 births
1951 deaths
Australian conductors (music)
Australian male composers
20th-century Australian musicians
20th-century classical composers
Australian classical composers
Australian male classical composers
Musicians from Adelaide
20th-century Australian male musicians
20th-century conductors (music)
19th-century conductors (music)
19th-century classical composers
19th-century Australian musicians
Religion in South Australia
Uniting Church in Australia
Australian Protestant religious leaders
Uniting Church in Australia people